"Errand of Mercy" is the twenty-sixth episode of the first season of the American science fiction television series Star Trek. Written by Gene L. Coon and directed by John Newland, it was first broadcast on March 23, 1967. It was the first episode in which the Klingons appeared.

In the episode, with a war with the Klingons declared, Captain Kirk and his First Officer, Mr. Spock, attempt to sway the incomprehensibly placid population of a planet near the Klingon border to resist an invading military occupation.

The Klingon governor, Kor (played by John Colicos), would return decades later in the Star Trek: Deep Space Nine episodes "Blood Oath", "The Sword of Kahless" and "Once More Unto the Breach". In "The Sword of Kahless", Worf mentions Kor's encounter with Kirk.

Plot
Negotiations between the United Federation of Planets and the Klingon Empire have collapsed, and the USS Enterprise is sent to the world of Organia, a non-aligned planet near the Klingon border, to prevent the Klingons from taking advantage of its strategic location. As the Enterprise approaches Organia, the ship is attacked and destroys a Klingon vessel.

Upon arriving on the planet's surface, Kirk and Spock find a peaceful but technologically primitive town. Kirk appeals to Ayelborne, the head of the local council to allow the Federation to help them resist Klingon occupation, but the Organians adamantly oppose any use of violence. When a Klingon fleet appears in orbit, Kirk orders the Enterprise to withdraw, which strands himself and Spock on the planet.

Ayelborne disguises Kirk and Spock to avoid suspicion and the Klingons seize control of the planet without resistance, installing the ranking Klingon officer, Kor, as the military governor. Kor has Spock questioned with a "mind sifter" device to confirm he is not a spy and designates Kirk as the Organian civilian liaison with the occupation force. Spock uses his mental discipline to withstand the scrutiny of the device.

That evening, in an attempt to inspire the Organians, Spock and Kirk sabotage a munitions dump outside the town. Ayelborne reveals the true identities of the Federation officers to Kor. He and the council then mysteriously free the two before the Klingons can torture information out of them. While Kirk and Spock try to comprehend the council's contradictory actions, Kor orders the execution of two hundred Organians, yet the council seems unmoved.

As the Federation and Klingon fleets ready themselves for a confrontation in the system, Kirk and Spock raid the Klingon headquarters in hopes of rousing the population into resistance. They capture Kor and prepare to make a last stand. The Organians then reveal their true nature: they are highly advanced incorporeal beings. They instantly incapacitate both sides, forcing them to agree to a cessation of hostilities. The Organians predict that the two sides will work together in the future.

Production
Story editor D.C. Fontana said she thought the Romulans were much more interesting than the Klingons but the Klingons were chosen as the regular adversaries of the series because they did not need any special makeup like the pointed ears for the Romulans.

The Klingons' dark-skinned, mustached look was the idea of John Colicos who played Kor. Makeup artist Fred Phillips agreed that they should have a "Genghis Khan" look. In Gene L. Coon's script the Klingons were described as simply "Oriental, hard-faced."

Reception
Zack Handlen of The A.V. Club gave the episode a 'B+' rating, describing it as "fun" but noting "logical holes throughout".

Hollywood.com said "Errand of Mercy" was among the best of Star Trek episodes about the Klingons, noting in this episode the war-craving Klingons thought the Organians were peasants. A ranking of every episode of the original series by Hollywood, placed this episode 25th out of 79 episodes.

In a review of fictional Star Trek aliens in 2018 by CBR, the Organians were noted as a powerful species. They were particularly impressed with the Organian character Trefayne, who was one of the Organian council members that talks to Kirk.

In 2016, SyFy ranked guest star John Colicos's performance as Kor (the Klingon leader), as the 13th best guest star on the original series. Colicos went on to reprise his role as Kor decades later on the Star Trek spin-off Star Trek: Deep Space Nine. The franchise was trying to do numerous cross-overs whenever possible to enhance franchise continuity. Directors were happy with enhancements to continuity, such as actors reprising their roles as characters the audience was already familiar with. Being consistent with continuity and bringing back old characters meant the audience would feel familiar with what was being presented.

A 2018 Star Trek binge-watching guide by Den of Geek, recommended this episode as part of the "foundations of Star Trek".

See also
 Observer Effect (Star Trek: Enterprise)

References

External links

"Errand of Mercy" Review of the remastered version at TrekMovie.com
"Errand of Mercy" Screenshots before and after remastering

Star Trek: The Original Series (season 1) episodes
1967 American television episodes
Television episodes written by Gene L. Coon